Yanan may refer to:

Yan'an, Chinese city in Shaanxi province, which was the Communist Party's capital from 1936 to 1948
Yanan language, or Yana language, extinct language  formerly spoken in north-central California
Yan An (born 1996), Chinese singer, member of Pentagon